Zamani Ibrahim (born 25 May 1971) also known as Zamani Slam is a popular influential pop rock singer from Malaysia. He started his singing career through the famous 1990s pop group, Slam from 1993 to 1999. He then launched a solo music career in 2002 and is now one of the best singers in Malaysia and Indonesia as well as regional countries. His powerful and unique vocals has gained him fans from all ages until he was placed on a par with the best vocalists in the country.

In 1998, he was selected among the Nation’s most renowned artists to perform during the closing ceremony of the 1998 Commonwealth Games in front of Queen Elizabeth II, Prince Philip, Duke of Edinburgh and among delegates and officials from 70 countries including those from the States Commonwealth. He sang the popular Malaysian song Isabella 98 with Jamal Abdillah, Saleem Iklim and Amy Search.

Beginning in 2015, the Malaysian music industry were shocked by the news of his arrest. He had tested positive for morphine and have been tried with drug possession charges. He was then released on bail and have been admitted to a local rehabilitation center. After several months of treatment, he was declared free from drugs and began returned to stage in 2016.

His brother Zulfazli Ibrahim  died on 19 November 2022. He died in his sleep.

Discography

Album 

Syair Si Pari-Pari (2002)
TERBAIK ZAMANI (2010)
Terima Kasih (2010)

Single 

Isabella '98 – with Jamal Abdillah, Amy and Saleem 
Syair Si Pari-Pari (2002)
Kala Hujan (2004)
Tak Keruan (2012) – with Sharifah Zarina 
Cahaya Asmara (2015)
Tambatan Hati (2016)
Aduh (2019)
Lima Aksara (2019) - with Ezad Lazim
Syawal Ini (2020)
''Yes Sir (2023; OST Coast Guard Malaysia: Ops Helang) - with Arif Peter

Filmography

Film

Telemovie

Television

Awards and nominations

Anugerah Industri Muzik

Anugerah Juara Lagu

Anugerah Bintang Popular Berita Harian

Others 

Voice of Asia 1997
 Bronze Award (with Slam)

Anugerah Musik Indonesia 1999
 Special Award (with Slam)

Anugerah Era 2002
 Best Male Vocal

Gegar Vaganza 5 (2018)

 3rd place

References

External links
 
 

Malaysian male pop singers
Living people
1971 births